This list of historical markers installed by the National Historical Commission of the Philippines (NHCP) in Northern Mindanao (Region X) is an annotated list of people, places, or events in the region that have been commemorated by cast-iron plaques issued by the said commission. The plaques themselves are permanent signs installed in publicly visible locations on buildings, monuments, or in special locations.

While many Cultural Properties have historical markers installed, not all places marked with historical markers are designated into one of the particular categories of Cultural Properties.

The marker for the Macapagal-Macaraeg House marker in Iligan, issued in 2002, became an issue because President Diosdado Macapagal never lived in the said house, although it became a home for his daughter President Gloria Macapagal-Arroyo, the president at that time.

This article lists twelve (12) markers from the Northern Mindanao region.

Bukidnon
This article lists one (1) marker from the Province of Bukidnon.

Camiguin
This article lists one (1) markers from the Province of Camiguin.

Lanao del Norte
This article lists one (1) marker from the Province of Lanao del Norte.

Misamis Occidental
This article lists three (3) markers from the Province of Misamis Occidental.

Misamis Oriental
This article lists six (6) markers from the Province of Misamis Oriental.

See also
List of Cultural Properties of the Philippines in Northern Mindanao

References

Footnotes

Bibliography 

A list of sites and structures with historical markers, as of 16 January 2012
A list of institutions with historical markers, as of 16 January 2012

External links
A list of sites and structures with historical markers, as of 16 January 2012
A list of institutions with historical markers, as of 16 January 2012
National Registry of Historic Sites and Structures in the Philippines
Policies on the Installation of Historical Markers

History of Northern Mindanao
Northern Mindanao